The Union of Christian Evangelical Baptist Churches of Moldova is a national fellowship of Baptist Christians in Moldova.

The first known Baptists in the region were nine people baptized by German Baptists in Turtinon in 1876. The first Russian congregation began in Kishinev in 1908. German Baptists formed an association in 1907 and Russian-speaking Baptists formed one in 1920. Under control of the USSR, Baptists and other Christians became restricted in their religious activities. The present Baptist Union was formed in 1991.

The Union is a member of the European Baptist Federation and the Baptist World Alliance. In 1995 there were 225 churches with over 17,000 members.

See also
 Baptist Union of Romania
 Baptists in Ukraine
 Brotherhood of Independent Baptist Churches and Ministries of Ukraine
 Evangelical Baptist Union of Ukraine

Christian organizations established in 1991
Baptist denominations in Europe
Baptist denominations established in the 20th century
Churches in Moldova
1991 establishments in Moldova